Firekeeper or flametender describes a specific ceremonial role, common in the religious practices of a variety of cultures. A firekeeper or flametender tends the sacred fire in the manner specific to the religious traditions of that culture.

Overview
In many ancient civilizations the open flame has served as both a central spiritual or religious symbol, as well as played a central role in basic human survival. Similarly, those entrusted with tending this flame often held a sacred role in the culture. This role continues in some traditional cultures into the present day. 

A sacred fire is often a place for the offering of prayers, herbs, food, and sacrifices of artwork. An eternal or perpetual flame provides hot coals for the kindling of other fires in the community. A sacred fire is usually kept separate from any cooking fire, and may be placed in or near a ceremonial enclosure.  

In the past world of no matches, and no easy ways of making fire under wet conditions, it was necessary for someone to always be present to keep the flames or red coals burning for long periods of time.

See also
Brigid - Irish Goddess and Saint served by women who tend an eternal flame
Homa (ritual) - Vedic fire sacrifice where offerings are made via a sacred fire
Hajji Firuz, Zoroastrian firekeeper.
Vestal Virgin - Roman flametenders

References

Religious occupations
Titles and occupations in Hinduism
Religious occupations of the indigenous peoples of North America